Beta Test is a 2016 American film written, produced, and directed by Nicholas Gyeney. Gyeney described the film as a cross between Die Hard, Gamer, and The Firm. The film stars Larenz Tate, Manu Bennett, Linden Ashby, and Yuji Okumoto. The film was released on July 22, 2016.

Plot

While testing the latest first person shooter from global game developer, Sentinel, video game champion Max Troy discovers the events happening within the game are being reflected in the real world. He soon determines that the game's protagonist is real-life Orson Creed, an ex-Sentinel employee who is being remotely controlled by the corporation for reasons unknown. As virtual and real worlds collide, Max and Creed must join forces to unravel the conspiracy before the game's sinister events escalate and overwhelm the city.

Cast
Manu Bennett as Orson Creed
Larenz Tate as Max Troy
Linden Ashby as Andrew Kincaid
Kevon Stover as Zane
Yuji Okumoto as The Surgeon
Brandy Kopp as Tech Support
Sara Coates as Abbie Creed, Orson's wife.
Edward Michael Scott as The Professional
Edi Zanidache as The Runt
Bill Sorice as Interviewer
Stefan Hajek as Slackjaw
Adrien Gamache as Caleb Angelo
Mark Riccardi as The 2nd Professional
Angela DiMarco as Lillian Brandt
Angela Okumoto as Reporter

Production

Development
Gyeney started developing Beta Test in the summer of 2014.

Gyeney provided information on the film stating "this film has 127 scenes and with [my] Type-A personality, I have a very specific vision."

Casting
Gyeney stated, "I'm not Steven Spielberg," while indicating that there would be no auditions or screen tests for the film. Scripts were sent out to actors whom Gyeney was familiar with, and those of whom liked the script with interest of being in the film were cast.

Larenz Tate was cast as the protagonist, Max. Manu Bennett as the hero video game character, Orson Creed. And, Linden Ashby as Kincaid, the primary villain of the film.

Filming
Principal photography was conducted in Seattle, Washington. It took place over 19 days starting November 7. 2014 and finishing on November 26, 2014.

Seattle was chosen as the place to shoot the film because it is Gyeney's hometown and he believed "shooting such a movie in the Northwest will diversify the local film community, which is mostly dominated by indie dramas. It could lead to an entire wave of action-oriented material being shot here, which would bring tons of work to local stunt teams and stuff that is totally nonexistent right now."

Gyeney stated, "the longest long-take fight sequence currently on record is three-and-a-half minutes, and it's held by the Korean movie 'Oldboy.' Our goal is to destroy that record."

Animation
Video game footage was needed to be developed for the film after principal photography was completed. It began in December 2014 starting with the character, Creed.

Release
The film was released on July 22, 2016. In their review for The Hollywood Reporter, Frank Scheck praised the film for being "impressively choreographed and filmed", though criticized the film for choosing technology over realism, as well as exploiting real life tragedies such as 9/11. He also criticized the "outdated visual style" of the graphics, which would be noticed by hardcore gamers, whom this film is targeted towards.

References

External links
 

2016 films
2016 action thriller films
2016 science fiction films
American science fiction action films
2016 independent films
American independent films
Films about video games
Films set in Washington (state)
Films set in Seattle
Films shot in Washington (state)
2010s English-language films
2010s American films